She Yuan ( 190s–220s), courtesy name Wenxiong, was an official of the state of Shu Han in the Three Kingdoms period of China. She Yuan was among the 11 recorded officers of Liu Bei who persuaded him to declare himself "King of Hanzhong" (漢中王).

Historical sources on She Yuan's life
She Yuan is first mentioned inside Liu Bei's biography as one of the 11 leading figures to have persuaded Liu Bei to declare himself a vassal king to challenge Cao Cao, who was enfeoffed ("King of Wei") by Emperor Xian in 219. During the fifth century, Pei Songzhi expanded about his life by incorporating information from the Sanfu Jue Lu Zhu (Annotated Selected Records of Sanfu), by Zhao Qi and Zhi Yu (摯虞).

Family background
She Yuan was from Youfufeng Commandery, Sili Province which is in present-day Xingping, Shaanxi. His ancestors were at first named Xie (謝) and were related to the Xie's Beidi clans of the north. The founding ancestor Xie Fu (謝服) joined the army as a general and participated in many expeditions. Because the Emperor believed that Xie was not an auspicious name; he changed it to She (射). From that moment on, Xie Fu's descendants adopted She as their surname.

She Jian
She Yuan had an older brother, She Jian (射堅) whose courtesy name was Wengu (文固). In his youth, She Jian had a good reputation. He was recruited to serve as a Gentleman of the Yellow Gate (黃門侍郎) in the office of the Three Excellencies. In 189, Emperor Xian of Han ascended the imperial throne. At the beginning of his reign, there was great famine and chaos even among the cities's district. She Jian left his office and along with She Yuan travelled southwest until they reached Yi Province where they joined his Governor Liu Zhang. Liu Zhang appointed She Jian as his Chief Clerk (長史). In 214, Liu Bei conquered Yi province and further employed She Jian as Administrator of Guanghan (廣漢太守) and Administrator of Shu Commandery (蜀郡太守).

Life
She Yuan at a young age was also famous because of his character. Grand Commandant (太尉), Huangfu Song esteemed him highly as a talented man therefore he arranged a marriage between his daughter and She Yuan. When Zhuge Liang opened his office as Chancellor (丞相), he appointed She Yuan as Libationer (祭酒). Later, he was transferred to serve as Officer to the Gentlemen of the Household (事中郎). He died in office.

Qing-era scholar Qian Dazhao (钱大昭) further believed that She Yuan is mentioned in Liu Bei's last will to his son as Master She (射君). The relevant passage is: "When Master She (射君) came, he told me that the Chancellor saw you as a bright and cultivated man exceeding all his expectations. If he see you as such, what further worry have I?"

See also
 Lists of people of the Three Kingdoms

Notes

References

 Chen, Shou (3rd century). Records of the Three Kingdoms (Sanguozhi).
 Pei, Songzhi (5th century). Annotations to Records of the Three Kingdoms (Sanguozhi zhu).

Year of birth unknown
Year of death unknown
Liu Zhang and associates
Shu Han politicians
Officials under Liu Bei
Han dynasty politicians from Shaanxi